Fumontana is a genus of harvestman that occurs in the United States (North Carolina and Tennessee) with one described species, F. deprehendor.

Biogeography
While members of the family Triaenochychidae are well represented in western North America, Chile, South Africa, New Zealand, Australia, Korea, and Japan, F. deprehendor is the first species found in the eastern United States. The Appalachian millipede genus Choctella shows a similar distribution, suggesting they both stem from the same Gondwanan fauna.

Certain aspects of its anatomy (such as position and form of the eye tubercle, and the male genitalia) make it likely that it is most closely related to genera in other parts of the world, such as Monomontia in South Africa or Hendea in New Zealand. F. deprehendor is thus likely an ancient relict, suggesting a wide distribution of the family before the current distribution of continents.

Habitat
It was first discovered in forest litter of Greenbrier Cove, Great Smoky Mountains National Park, Tennessee. About 30 years later, 22 new populations were found in the region, including habitats in southwestern Virginia, eastern Tennessee, western North Carolina, and northern Georgia. The majority was found in heights above , and they were most abundant in well decayed hemlock logs.

Name
The genus name is derived from the Latin words for "smoke" and "mountain". The species name is Latin for "one who takes by surprise".

References

External links

Harvestmen
Arachnids of North America
Fauna of the Eastern United States
Endemic fauna of the United States
Monotypic arachnid genera